Sudipto Gupta was a 22-year-old student who died on 2 April 2013 while in police custody following his arrest at a demonstration in Kolkata, India.

Sudipto was a student of political science at Rabindra Bharati University, and a  state committee member in the Students' Federation of India (SFI), the student wing of the Communist Party of India (Marxist). He was injured while being transported to jail by bus. Police claim that he was hanging his head out of the window and hit a lamppost, while students maintain, he was beaten by police. The bus driver was arrested and charged with negligent driving. When Sudipto hit a lamp-post, one police hit him just above the nose, on his forehead with a baton and he fell down. His eyes bulged out and his eyes and nose were bleeding profusely.

Post mortem examination found multiple injuries on his body, heart, lung and brain, along with internal bleeding and pulmonary contusion consistent with assault. However, a magisterial inquiry ruled out any role or negligence of the police in the death stating it was caused due to an accident.

References

2013 deaths
Activists from West Bengal
Deaths by person in India
Deaths in police custody in India
Road incident deaths in India